Bernard Lee "Pretty" Purdie (born June 11, 1939) is an American drummer, and an influential R&B, soul and funk musician. He is known for his precise musical time keeping and his signature use of triplets against a half-time backbeat: the "Purdie Shuffle." He was inducted into the Modern Drummer Hall of Fame in 2013.

Purdie recorded Soul Drums (1968) as a band leader and although he went on to record Alexander's Ragtime Band, the album remained unreleased until Soul Drums was reissued on CD in 2009 with the Alexander's Ragtime Band sessions. Other solo albums include Purdie Good! (1971), Soul Is... Pretty Purdie (1972) and the soundtrack for the blaxploitation film Lialeh (1973).

In the mid-1990s he was a member of The 3B's, with Bross Townsend and Bob Cunningham.

Biography
Purdie was born on June 11, 1939 in Elkton, Maryland, US, the eleventh of fifteen children. At an early age he began hitting cans with sticks and learned the elements of drumming techniques from overhearing lessons being given by Leonard Heywood. He later took lessons from Heywood and played in Heywood's big band. Purdie's other influences at that time were Papa Jo Jones, Buddy Rich, Gene Krupa, Joe Marshall, Art Blakey, as well as Cozy Cole, Sticks Evans, Panama Francis, Louis Bellson, and Herbie Lovelle.

In 1961, he moved from his home town of Elkton, Maryland, to New York City. There he played sessions with Mickey and Sylvia and regularly visited the Turf Club on 50th and Broadway, where musicians, agents, and promoters met and touted for business. It was during this period that he played for the saxophonist Buddy Lucas, who nicknamed him 'Mississippi Bigfoot'. Eventually Barney Richmond contracted him to play session work. 

Purdie was contracted by arranger Sammy Lowe to play a session with James Brown in 1965 and recording session records also show that Purdie played on "Ain't That A Groove" at the same session.  Purdie is credited on James Brown's albums Say It Loud – I'm Black and I'm Proud (1969) and Get on the Good Foot (1972).

Purdie started working with Aretha Franklin as musical director in 1970 and held that position for five years, as well as drumming for Franklin's opening act, saxophonist King Curtis and The King Pins. March 5–7, 1971, he performed with both bands at the Fillmore West; the resulting live recordings were released as Aretha Live At The Fillmore West (May 19, 1971) and King Curtis's Live At Fillmore West (1971). His best known track with Franklin was "Rock Steady", on which he played what he described as "a funky and low down beat". Of his time with Franklin he once commented that "backing her was like floating in seventh heaven".

Purdie was credited on the soundtrack album for the film Sgt. Pepper's Lonely Hearts Club Band (1978) and later he was the drummer for the 2009 Broadway revival of Hair and appeared on the associated Broadway cast recording. In 2016, he was awarded an honorary doctorate in music by Five Towns College.

Purdie has been a resident of New Jersey, living in Edison, Teaneck and Springfield Township. In 2023, he moved to New Bern, North Carolina.

Encounter Records
Purdie founded Encounter Records in 1973 and released five albums:
EN 3000: Seldon Powell – Messin' With Seldon Powell (with Jimmy Owens, Garnett Brown)
EN 3001: Sands of Time – Profile (with Jimmy Owens, Garnett Brown, Seldon Powell)
EN 3002: East Coast – East Coast (with Larry Blackmon, Gwen Guthrie, Haras Fyre)
EN 3003: Frank Owens – Brown 'N' Serve (with Hugh McCracken)
EN 3004: Harold Vick as "Sir Edward" – The Power of Feeling (with Victor Gaskin)

Drumming style

Purdie is known as a groove drummer with immaculate timing who makes use of precision half note, backbeats, and grooves. Purdie's signature sixteenth note hi-hat lick pish-ship, pish-ship, pish-ship is distinct. He often employs a straight eight groove sometimes fusing several influences such as swing, blues and funk. He created the now well-known drum pattern Purdie Half-Time Shuffle that is a blues shuffle variation with the addition of syncopated ghost notes on the snare drum. Variations on this shuffle can be heard on songs such as Led Zeppelin's  "Fool in the Rain", the Police's "Walking on the Moon", and Toto's "Rosanna" (Rosanna shuffle). Purdie plays the shuffle on Steely Dan's "Babylon Sisters" and "Home At Last".

Discography

As leader/co-leader
 Soul Drums (Date/Columbia, 1967)
 Purdie Good! (Prestige, 1971) [note: reissued as Legends of Acid Jazz: Bernard Purdie in 1996]
 Stand by Me (Whatcha See Is Whatcha Get) (Mega Records [in the 'Flying Dutchman Series'], 1972) with The Playboys
 Soul Is... Pretty Purdie (Flying Dutchman, 1972; reissued on BGP/Ace in 2014)
 Shaft (Prestige, 1973) recorded 1971 [note: reissued as Legends of Acid Jazz: Bernard Purdie in 1996]
 Lialeh (Original Movie Soundtrack) (Bryan, 1974)
 Delights of the Garden (Douglas/Celluloid, 1975) with The Last Poets
 Purdie as a Picture (Kilmarnock, 1993) with Galt MacDermot's New Pulse Jazz Band
 Bernard Purdie's Jazz Groove Sessions in Tokyo (Lexington/West 47th, 1993)
 Coolin' 'N Groovin' (A Night At 'On-Air') (Lexington/West 47th, 1993)
 After Hours with The 3B's (3B's Music, 1993)
 Soothin' 'N Groovin' With The 3B's (3B's Music, 1994) with Houston Person 
 The Hudson River Rats (3B's Music, 1995)
 Fatback! The Jazz Funk Masters Featuring Bernard Purdie (Seven Seas, 1995) 
 Kick 'N Jazz (Drum Beat Blocks, 1996)
 Soul to Jazz I (Act, 1996) with The WDR Big Band
 Soul to Jazz II (Act, 1997) with The WDR Big Band
 In the Pocket (P-Vine, 1997)
 Get It While You Can (3B's Music, 1999) with The Hudson River Rats
 The Masters of Groove Meet Dr. No (Jazzateria, 2001) with Reuben Wilson, Grant Green Jr., Tarus Mateen
 King Of The Beat (3B's Music, 2001)
 Purdie Good Cookin'  (3B's Music, 2003) with Purdie's Powerhouse 
 The Godfathers of Groove (18th & Vine, 2007) with Reuben Wilson, Grant Green Jr., Jerry Jemmott [note: originally released as The Masters of Groove]
 The Godfathers of Groove 3 (18th & Vine, 2009) with Reuben Wilson, Grant Green Jr., Bill Easley
 Jersey Blue (Running Rogue, 2009) with Gene McCormick, Jack Hoban
 Selling It Like It Is (Cadence Jazz, 2009 [rel. 2013]) with David Haney
 Cool Down (Sugar Road, 2018)

As sideman

Herbie Mann – Our Mann Flute (Atlantic, 1966)
Jack McDuff – A Change Is Gonna Come (Atlantic, 1966)
Freddie McCoy – Funk Drops (Prestige, 1966)
Gábor Szabó – Jazz Raga (Impulse!, 1966)
Benny Golson – Tune In, Turn On (Verve, 1967)
King Curtis & The Kingpins – Instant Groove (Atco, 1967)
Tim Rose – Tim Rose (Columbia, 1967)
Nina Simone – Nina Simone Sings the Blues (RCA Victor, 1967)
Phil Upchurch – Feeling Blue (Milestone, 1967)
Nina Simone – Silk & Soul (RCA Victor, 1967)
Tom Rush – The Circle Game (Elektra, 1968)
The Soul Finders – Sweet Soul Music (RCA Camden CAS-2170, 1968)
Wilson Pickett – The Midnight Mover (Atlantic, 1968)
David "Fathead" Newman – Bigger & Better (Atlantic, 1968)
David "Fathead" Newman – The Many Facets of David Newman (Atlantic, 1969)
Freddie McCoy – Listen Here (Prestige, 1968)
Albert Ayler – New Grass (Impulse!, 1968)
Shirley Scott – Soul Song (Atlantic, 1968)
Solomon Burke – King Solomon (Atlantic, 1968)
Gary McFarland – America the Beautiful: An Account of Its Disappearance (Skye, 1969)
Jimmy McGriff – Electric Funk (Blue Note, 1969)
Sonny Phillips – Sure 'Nuff (Prestige, 1969)
John Lee Hooker – Simply the Truth (BluesWay, 1969)
Randy Brecker – Score (Solid State, 1969)
Carla Thomas – Memphis Queen (Stax, 1969)
Al Kooper – You Never Know Who Your Friends Are (Columbia, 1969)
Hank Crawford – Mr. Blues Plays Lady Soul (Atlantic, 1969)
Gary Burton – Good Vibes (Atlantic, 1969)
Shirley Scott – Shirley Scott & the Soul Saxes (Atlantic, 1969)
Yusef Lateef – Yusef Lateef's Detroit (Atlantic, 1969)
Boogaloo Joe Jones – Boogaloo Joe (Prestige, 1969)
Johnny "Hammond" Smith – Soul Talk (Prestige, 1969)
Gene Ammons – The Boss Is Back! (Prestige, 1969)
Gene Ammons – Brother Jug! (Prestige, 1969)
Rusty Bryant – Night Train Now! (Prestige, 1969)
Herbie Hancock – Fat Albert Rotunda (Warner Bros., 1969)
Dizzy Gillespie – Cornucopia (Solid State, 1969)
Johnny "Hammond" Smith – Black Feeling! (Prestige, 1969)
Larry Coryell – Coryell (Vanguard, 1969)
Sonny Phillips – Black on Black! (Prestige, 1970)
Jimmy McGriff & Junior Parker – The Dudes Doin' Business (Capitol, 1970)
Johnny "Hammond" Smith – Here It 'Tis (Prestige, 1970)
Louis Armstrong − Louis Armstrong and His Friends (Flying Dutchman, 1970)
Boogaloo Joe Jones – Right On Brother (Prestige, 1970)
Boogaloo Joe Jones – No Way! (Prestige, 1970)
Robert Palmer's Insect Trust – Hoboken Saturday Night (Atco, 1970)
Charles Kynard – Afro-Disiac (Prestige, 1970)
Five Stairsteps – O-o-h Child (Buddah, 1970)
Charles Kynard – Wa-Tu-Wa-Zui (Beautiful People) (Prestige, 1970)
Houston Person – Houston Express (Prestige, 1970)
Eddie Palmieri – Harlem River Drive (Roulette, 1971)
Hank Crawford – It's a Funky Thing to Do (Cotillion, 1971)
Boogaloo Joe Jones – What It Is (Prestige, 1971)
Eddie Harris & Les McCann – Second Movement (Atlantic, 1971)
David "Fathead" Newman – Captain Buckles (Cotillion, 1971)
Oliver Nelson – Swiss Suite (Flying Dutchman, 1971)
King Curtis – Live at Fillmore West (Atlantic, 1971)
Johnny "Hammond" Smith – Wild Horses Rock Steady (Kudu, 1971)
Larry Coryell – Fairyland (Flying Dutchman, 1971)
Eddie "Cleanhead" Vinson – You Can't Make Love Alone (Flying Dutchman, 1971)
Herbie Mann – Push Push (Atlantic, 1971)
Dizzy Gillespie – The Real Thing (Perception, 1971)
Gato Barbieri – El Pampero (Flying Dutchman, 1971)
Gil Scott-Heron – Pieces of a Man (Flying Dutchman, 1971)
Aretha Franklin - Amazing Grace (Atlantic, 1972) 
Les McCann – Invitation to Openness (Atlantic, 1972)
Hank Crawford – Help Me Make It Through the Night (Kudu, 1972)
Aretha Franklin – Young, Gifted and Black (Atlantic, 1972)
Hubert Laws – Wild Flower (Atlantic, 1972)
Leon Thomas – Blues and the Soulful Truth (Flying Dutchman, 1972)
Esther Phillips – Alone Again, Naturally (Kudu, 1972)
Miles Davis – Get Up with It (Columbia, 1972)
Dakota Staton – Madame Foo-Foo (Groove Merchant, 1972)
Ronnie Foster – Sweet Revival (Blue Note, 1972)
Hank Crawford – We Got a Good Thing Going (Kudu, 1972)
Roberta Flack & Donny Hathaway – Roberta Flack & Donny Hathaway (Atlantic, 1972)
Esther Phillips – From a Whisper to a Scream (Kudu, 1972)
Jackie Lomax – Three (Warner Bros., 1972)
B.B. King – Guess Who (ABC, 1972)
Buddy Terry – Lean on Him (Mainstream, 1973)
David "Fathead" Newman – The Weapon (Atlantic, 1973)
Gato Barbieri – Bolivia (Flying Dutchman, 1973)
Leon Thomas – Full Circle (Flying Dutchman, 1973)
Richard "Groove" Holmes – Night Glider (Groove Merchant, 1973)
Garland Jeffreys – Garland Jeffreys (Atlantic, 1973)
Lightnin' Rod – Hustlers Convention (Celluloid, 1973)
Cat Stevens – Foreigner (A&M, 1973)
Hall & Oates – Abandoned Luncheonette (Atlantic, 1973)
Bette Midler – Bette Midler (Atlantic, 1973)
Margie Joseph – Margie Joseph (Atlantic, 1973)
Jimmy McGriff & Richard "Groove" Holmes – Giants of the Organ Come Together (Groove Merchant, 1973)
Richard "Groove" Holmes − New Groove (Groove Merchant, 1974)
Robert Palmer – Sneakin' Sally Through the Alley (Island, 1974)
Gato Barbieri – Yesterdays (Flying Dutchman, 1974)
Aretha Franklin – With Everything I Feel in Me (Atlantic, 1974)
Richie Havens – Mixed Bag II (Verve, 1974)
Joe Cocker – I Can Stand a Little Rain (A&M, 1974)
Rusty Bryant – Until It's Time for You to Go (Prestige, 1974)
Margie Joseph – Sweet Surrender (Atlantic, 1974)
Aretha Franklin – Let Me in Your Life (Atlantic, 1974)
Tim Moore – Tim Moore (Mooncrest, 1974)
Esther Phillips – Performance (Kudu, 1974)
Arif Mardin – Journey (Atlantic, 1974)
Roy Ayers Ubiquity – Change Up the Groove (Polydor, 1974)
Cornell Dupree – Teasin''' (Atlantic, 1975)
Geoff Muldaur – Is Having a Wonderful Time (Reprise, 1975)
Todd Rundgren – Initiation (Bearsville, 1975)
Margie Joseph – Margie (Atlantic, 1975)
Joe Cocker – Jamaica Say You Will (A&M, 1975)
Roy Ayers Ubiquity - A Tear to a Smile (Polydor, 1975)
Jorge Dalto – Chevere (United Artists, 1976)
Hummingbird – We Can't Go On Meeting Like This (A&M, 1976)
Michael Bolton – Michael Bolotin (RCA, 1975)
Steely Dan – The Royal Scam (ABC, 1976)
Steely Dan – Aja (ABC, 1977)
Hummingbird – Diamond Nights (A&M, 1977)
Alfred "Pee Wee" Ellis – Home In The Country (Savoy, 1977)
Joe Cocker – Luxury You Can Afford (Elektra, 1978)
Kate & Anna McGarrigle – Pronto Monto (Warner Bros., 1978)
Cheryl Lynn – Cheryl Lynn (Columbia, 1978)
Felix Pappalardi – Don't Worry, Ma (A&M, 1979)
Cheryl Lynn – In Love (Columbia, 1979)
Dizzy Gillespie – Digital at Montreux, 1980 (Pablo, 1980)
Steely Dan – Gaucho (MCA, 1980)
Al Johnson – Back for More (Columbia, 1980)
Aretha Franklin – Aretha (Arista, 1980)
B.B. King – There Must Be a Better World Somewhere (MCA, 1981)
Houston Person – Heavy Juice (Muse, 1982)
Houston Person – Always on My Mind (Muse, 1985)
Bob Cunningham – Walking Bass (Nilva [Fr], 1985)
Hank Crawford & Jimmy McGriff – Soul Survivors (Milestone, 1986)
Hank Crawford – Mr. Chips (Milestone, 1986)
Jimmy McGriff – The Starting Five (Milestone, 1987)
Flip Phillips & Scott Hamilton – A Sound Investment (Concord, 1987)
Jimmy McGriff – Blue to the 'Bone (Milestone, 1988)
Hank Crawford – Night Beat (Milestone, 1989)
Jimmy McGriff – You Ought to Think About Me (Headfirst, 1990)
Hank Crawford – Groove Master (Milestone, 1990)
Garland Jeffreys – Don't Call Me Buckwheat (BMG, 1991)
Cissy Houston & Chuck Jackson – I'll Take Care of You (Shanachie, 1992)
Al Green – Don't Look Back (BMG, 1993)
Carrie Smith – June Night (Black & Blue, 1993)
Laura Nyro – Walk the Dog and Light the Light (Columbia, 1993)
Pucho & His Latin Soul Brothers – Jungle Strut (Lexington/West 47th, 1993; reissued as Pucho's Descarga on ¡Andale! in 2014) 
Carrie Smith – Every Now and Then (Silver Shadow, 1994)
Jimmy Smith – Damn! (Verve, 1995)
Al Green – Your Heart's in Good Hands (MCA, 1995)
Houston Person – The Opening Round (Savant, 1997)
Hank Crawford & Jimmy McGriff – Road Tested (Milestone, 1997)
Jimmy McGriff – The Dream Team (Milestone, 1997) 
Hank Crawford – After Dark (Milestone, 1998)
Jimmy McGriff – Straight Up (Milestone, 1998)
Hank Crawford & Jimmy McGriff – Crunch Time (Milestone, 1999)
Jimmy McGriff – McGriff's House Party (Milestone, 2000)
Reuben Wilson – Organ Blues (Jazzateria, 2001)
Oliver Darley – Introducing Oliver Darley (East West, 2001)
Jimmy McGriff – McGriff Avenue (Milestone, 2002)
Elliott Randall – Still Reelin [EP] (Private Collection Records, 2007)
Larry Coryell – Earthquake at the Avalon, (Inakustik, 2009)
Hair – Broadway Cast Recording (Ghostlight/Razor & Tie, 2009)
Chihiro Yamanaka – Reminiscence (Verve, 2011)
Mick Taylor – 'East Coast Tour Appearances' (2012)
Vulfpeck – 'Various Tour Appearances' (2016)
Eddie Palmieri – Sabiduria (Wisdom) (Ropeadope, 2017)
George Freeman–Mike Allemana Organ Quartet with special guest: Bernard Purdie – Live at the Green Mill (Ears & Eyes, 2017)
Gonzalo Aloras – Nuestra Canción (2020)
Vulfpeck – The Joy of Music, The Job of Real Estate (Vulf, 2020)

References

Bibliography
Everett, Walter. The Beatles as musicians: the Quarry Men through Rubber Soul. Oxford University Press US (2001). 
Gottfridsson, Hans Olof; Sheridan, Tony and Beatles. The Beatles from Cavern to Star-Club: The Illustrated Chronicle, Discography & Price Guide 1957–1962. Premium Publishing (1997). 
Kernfeld, Barry Dean. The New Grove Dictionary of Jazz second edition. Grove's Dictionaries Inc. (2002). Digitized 21 Dec (2006). 
Miles, Barry, and Badman, Keith. The Beatles Diary: The Beatles years. Omnibus Press (2001) 
Payne, Jim and Weinger, Harry. The Great Drummers of R&B Funk & Soul. Mel Bay Publications (2007). 
 Rabb, Johnny; Brych, Ray and Lohman, Gregg. Jungle/Drum 'n' Bass for the Acoustic Drum Set: A Guide to Applying Today's Electronic Music to the Drum Set. Alfred Publishing (2001). 
Weinberg, Max. The Big Beat: Conversations with Rock's Greatest Drummers. Hal Leonard Corporation (2004). 
York, William. Who's Who in Rock Music''+. Atomic Press (1978). Digitized 30 Aug 2007.

External links

1941 births
American funk drummers
American jazz drummers
American rock drummers
American session musicians
American soul musicians
Flying Dutchman Records artists
James Brown Orchestra members
Jazz-blues musicians
Living people
Musicians from Edison, New Jersey
People from Elkton, Maryland
People from Springfield Township, Union County, New Jersey
People from Teaneck, New Jersey
Rhythm and blues drummers
Soul drummers
Soul-jazz drummers
Hummingbird (band) members
20th-century American drummers
American male drummers
Jazz musicians from Maryland
American male jazz musicians
The 3B's members
ACT Music artists
A&M Records artists
Capitol Records artists
Atco Records artists
African-American drummers